Camden High School is a government-funded co-educational comprehensive secondary day school, located in the town of Camden, in the Macarthur region of New South Wales, Australia. 

Established in 1956, the school catered for approximately 1,100 students, from Year 7 to Year 12, of whom five percent identified as Indigenous Australians and ten percent were from a language background other than English. The school is operated by the NSW Department of Education; the principal is Melinda Brady.

Overview 
The school motto is "Together We Achieve". 

The school lays an emphasis on traditional subjects, while offering several vocational education courses. It has strong ties with the local community and emphasises involvement, caring and responsibility. It has a particularly strong co-curriculum that features the creative and performing arts, adventure programs and sports. Its mission statement emphasises its purpose to enable students to reach their full potential through encouraging achievement, positive values and the desire to learn.

Sporting exchange program 

Camden High School has one of the longest running sporting exchanges in Australia.  Many thousands of young people have benefited from this wonderful sporting event, and lifelong friendships have been forged between city and country.  In the early 1970s Paul Montgomery, an English teacher at Camden High School had the idea that a sporting competition with another school over a three-day period would be a wonderful way of forging valuable links between students from different backgrounds.    With the Principal, Phillip Patterson, it was decided that the school should be a rural school of comparable size and approximately a four-hour distance from Camden.  This would make the travelling time manageable while still providing enough distance to make the enterprise adventurous for the students.

Letters were sent to a number of schools and Cowra High School was eventually chosen as the perfect school with which to establish the competition.  In 1972, the first exchange occurred with Cowra students travelling to Camden for the inaugural games.  It was decided at this stage to name the competition in honour of the late Robert Montgomery who had been the Deputy Principal at Camden High from 1969-1970.  Many years later, the games continue to provide many students with wonderful sporting, cultural and social experiences.  This is the result of the continued commitment of all staff at both schools and particularly the team coaches and the chief organisers.  In recent years, Anna-Lisa Reeves from Camden High and Steve Johnstone from Cowra High have spent a great deal of time and effort ensuring these games continue to flourish.  Camden High School also has an outstanding Trade Training Centre which it shares with students from Elderslie High School and Elizabeth Macarthur High School.

Location
The school was originally situated on John and Exeter Streets within the town of Camden itself. This site was previously a gasworks and after industrial contamination was discovered at the school in 1995, including BTEX, PAH, cyanides and sulphates, it was closed down. The property was completely fenced off pending remediation. An unknown number of former students who attended the original site became ill. Marsdens solicitors in Camden commenced preparation of a class action against the Department of Education. On 23 July 2013 the ABC TV 7.30 Report aired details of an investigate report into the matter.

Construction of the new high school was completed in 2001, with students and staff making use of the new facilities from the end of that year.

See also 

 List of government schools in New South Wales
 Education in Australia

References

External links

Educational institutions established in 1956
Public high schools in New South Wales
1956 establishments in Australia
Camden, New South Wales